Gino is a surname. Notable people with the surname include:

Alex Gino, American children's book writer
Federico Gino (born 1993), Uruguayan footballer
Francesca Gino, Italian-American behavioral scientist
Klodian Gino (born 1994), Albanian footballer playing in Greece

See also
Gino (given name)
Gino (disambiguation)